The NAACP Image Award for Outstanding International Motion Picture was created in 2013 and discontinued a year later. The award returned during the 2021 ceremony.

History
It was only rewarded twice in the awards history.

Winners and nominees

2013
The Intouchables (France)
 Chico and Rita (Spain, United Kingdom)
 For Greater Glory: The True Story of Cristiada (Mexico)
 Forces spéciales (France)
 The Raid: Redemption (Indonesia, France, United States)

2014
War Witch (Canada)
 Call Me Kuchu (United States, Uganda)
 High Tech, Low Life (China, United States)
 La Playa DC (Colombia, Brazil, France)
 Lion Ark (United States, United Kingdom, Bolivia)

2021
 Night of the Kings (France)
 Ainu Mosir (Japan)
 His House (United States)
 The Last Tree (United Kingdom)
 The Life Ahead (Italy)

2022 

 7 Prisoners (Brazil)
 African America (South Africa, United States)
 Eyimofe (This is My Desire) (Nigeria)
 Flee (United States, United Kingdom, France, Sweden, Norway, Denmark)
 The Gravedigger's Wife (France, Somalia, Germany, Finland)

2023 

 Athena (France)
 Bantú Mama (Dominican Republic)
 Broker (South Korea)
 Learn To Swim (Canada)
 The Silent Twins (United Kingdom, Poland, United States)

See also
2013 in film
2014 in film
Academy Award for Best Foreign Language Film

References

NAACP Image Awards
Awards established in 2013
Awards disestablished in 2014
Awards established in 2021